Manukan, officially the Municipality of Manukan (Subanen: Benwa Manukan; Chavacano: Municipalidad de Manukan), is a 3rd class municipality in the province of Zamboanga del Norte, Philippines. According to the 2020 census, it has a population of 36,887 people.

History
During the Pre-Spanish era this town was inhabited by the Subanons. During the Spanish colonization, Manukan was a barrio part of Dapitan. In the creation of the municipality of Katipunan, this barrio became a barangay Manukan.  Chickens were plenty and breeds that supply the northern part of Mindanao come from this town. "Manukan" word means poultry farm.
On June 16, 1951, thru the effort of former Congressman (and later Senator) Roseller T. Lim with the help of Governor Serapio J. Datoc of the former Province of Zamboanga, President Elpidio Quirino signed into law Republic Act No. 655 creating the municipality of Manukan. In 1952, the barrios of Manukan, Lipras, Dipane, Linay, Mate, Sirongan, Libuton, Disakan, Siparok, Ponot, and Manawan of Katipunan were formed into the town of Manukan.

Sitio Libuton became a barangay in 1954.

Lipras was renamed San Antonio in 1957.

Geography

Climate

Barangays
Manukan is politically subdivided into 22 barangays. The central Poblacion is where the municipal seat is located. Nine of the barangays are along the national highway and the rest of them are mountain barangays, being three or more kilometers away from the national highway that runs mostly along the coast of the municipality.

Demographics

Economy

Education

Manukan I District
Manukan East Central School
Manukan West Central School
L. Disakan
Libuton ES
Mate ES
Palaranan ES
Patunan ES
Upper Disakan
Serongan ES
Suisayan ES
Patagan PS
Pangandao PS
Sitog PS
Tiniguiban
Upper Disakan NHS
Manukan National High School

Manukan II District
Linay CS
Dipane ES
J. Aguirre
Gupot ES
Lingatongan
Loquillos ES
Lupasang ES
Meses PS
Saluyong ES
Villaramos
San Antonio
Manukan NHS
Villaramos NHS
Saint Estanislao Kostka College Inc.

References

External links
 Manukan Profile at PhilAtlas.com
 [ Philippine Standard Geographic Code]
Philippine Census Information

Municipalities of Zamboanga del Norte